The Ganhada (variously spelled, but often as G̱anhada) is the name for the Raven "clan" (phratry) in the language of the Tsimshian nation of British Columbia, Canada, and southeast Alaska. It is considered analogous or identical to the G̱anada (Raven/Frog) Tribe of the Nisga'a nation in British Columbia and the Frog clan among B.C.'s Gitxsan nation. The Gitxsan also sometimes use the term Laxsee'le to describe the Frog clan.

Nisg̱a'a - G̱anada

The house groups of the G̱anada among the Nisga’a include:
 (People-Where-Water-Runs-Black) Clan:
 House of  - Wallace Clark
 House of  - Earl Munroe (Previously Oscar Mercer)
 House of  - Wayne Nisyok
 House of  - (previously Sidney Alexander) (not to be confused with eagle chieftain name Tx̱aalax̱hatkw)
 House of  - Earl Stephens (previously Horace Stephens)
 House of  - (previously Richard Leeson)
 House of  - Chester Moore
 House of  - Leonard Watts
 House of  - Bert Adams, Sr
 House of  - Larry Derrick

See also
 Raven Tales

References

 Barbeau, Marius (1929) Totem Poles of the Gitksan, Upper Skeena River, British Columbia.  (Anthropological Series 12, National Museum of Canada Bulletin 61.)  Ottawa: Canada, Department of Mines.
 Barbeau, Marius (1950) Totem Poles.  (2 vols.)  (Anthropology Series 30, National Museum of Canada Bulletin 119.)  Ottawa: National Museum of Canada.  Reprinted, Canadian Museum of Civilization, Hull, Quebec, 1990.
 Council of Elders, Ayuuḵhl Nisg̱a'a Department & Nisg̱a'a Lisims Government (2008) Anhluut'ukwsim Saẁinskhl Nisg̱a'a: Nisg̱a'a Feast Procedures & Protocols Gitlax̱t'aamiks, British Columbia

Tsimshian
Gitxsan
Nisga'a
Clans and Houses of the indigenous peoples of the Pacific Northwest Coast